"Mississippi Cotton Picking Delta Town" is a song written by Harold Dorman and George Gann, and recorded by American country music artist Charley Pride.  It was released in August 1974 as the first single from his album Pride of America.  The song peaked at number 3 on the Billboard Hot Country Singles chart. It also reached number 1 on the RPM Country Tracks chart in Canada.

Chart performance

References

External links
 

1974 singles
Charley Pride songs
Songs written by Harold Dorman
RCA Records singles
1974 songs